Michael Harry Repacholi (born in Taree, NSW, Australia June 30, 1944) is an Australian biophysicist and radiation protection expert. He is one of the pioneer scientists and foremost authorities in Radiobiology in the world, including radiation protection standards for ionizing radiation and non-ionizing radiation across the electromagnetic spectrum. He was one of the founders and past presidents of the International Commission on Non-Ionizing Radiation Protection (ICNIRP) and founder and director of several projects in the World Health Organization, including the International Electromagnetic Fields (EMF) Project. Repacholi was also active in the study of the health consequences of the Chernobyl accident in the nuclear reactor, in Ukraine.

Education 
Repacholi received his BSc in Physics at the University of Western Australia in 1965, a Master of Science at the University of London, United Kingdom in 1969, and a Doctor of Philosophy in Biology at Ottawa University, Canada, in 1980.

Career 
After graduation, he started working as a radiation protection physicist at the State X-Ray Laboratory in Perth. He went on to study for an MSc degree in radiobiology from London University, UK. After completing his master's degree in 1969, he was offered a position as a radiation physicist at the Alan Blair Memorial Hospital in Regina, Saskatchewan, Canada where he worked as a radiotherapy treatment planner for cancer patients. While in Regina, he collaborated with John R Cunningham and Harold E Johns (designer of the first cobalt-60 and betatron cancer treatment units) at the Ontario Cancer Institute in Toronto, to develop and use remote computer planning programs for cancer treatment.

He was then offered a position as a radiation protection scientist at the Radiation Protection Bureau of Health and Welfare Canada in Ottawa. During this time, he was promoted Head of the Non-Ionizing Radiation (NIR) Section, responsible for developing regulations on microwave ovens, radiofrequency safety standards, as well as ultrasound, ultraviolet and laser safety procedures. During this period, he completed his PhD in Biology from Ottawa University in Canada in 1980, under the advisorship of Professor Jacob Gordin Kaplan.

Repacholi then took up the position of Chief Scientist at Royal Adelaide Hospital in South Australia in 1983 where he continued work in radiation protection and research on applications of electromagnetic fields (EMF) for medical procedures. Laser research programs involved the use of Nd:YAG lasers for tonsillectomy and CuBr lasers for removal of port-wine stains. From 1988 to 1990 Dr Repacholi was President of the Australasian Radiation Protection Society, and in the period 1989–1991 President of the Australian College of Physical Scientists and Engineers in Medicine. He was subsequently elected as a Fellow of both professional societies.

He was seconded to the Australian Radiation Laboratory (now called the Australian Radiation Protection and Nuclear Safety Agency, ARPANSA) to conduct animal research to determine whether exposure to extremely low frequency fields (ELF) or radiofrequency fields could promote cancer in genetically engineered mice that were predisposed to get lymphoma. The Eµ-Pim1 mouse was considered to be a very sensitive model for this. RF fields were reported to have carcinogenic potential, but two subsequent replication studies failed to reproduce this result. However, this Eµ-Pim1 mouse study stimulated a huge amount of research among EMF scientists around the world.

Work on non-ionizing radiation protection 
In the years between working in Ottawa and then in [Adelaide], Repacholi became a founding member and subsequent chairman of the International Non-Ionizing Radiation Committee of the International Radiation Protection Association (INIRC/IRPA). This committee was responsible for developing international guidance on NIR protection and particularly exposure limits to EMF, that quickly became accepted by many countries dealing with significant public concern about health effects from these fields. This committee was then elevated by IRPA to become an independent international commission similar to the very successful International Commission on Radiological Protection (ICRP) for ionizing radiation.
 
Repacholi was elected as the founding Chairman of the International Commission on Non-Ionizing Radiation Protection (ICNIRP) in 1992. ICNIRP provides guidelines on limiting exposure to all non-ionizing radiations and its guidelines on radiofrequency fields, especially from mobile communications equipment, are now accepted as the international standard by over 50 countries around the world, including Australia. Dr Repacholi was awarded the Health Physics Society’s, W.G. Morgan Lectureship for "Outstanding international contribution to the radiation field" in June 1993 and honorary life membership in the Italian Radiation Protection Society in 1994.

During Repacholi's chairmanship of ICNIRP, the Commission became a formally recognized Non-Governmental Organization (NGO) in formal relations with the World Health Organization (WHO), the International Labour Office (ILO) and the European Commission (EC). ICNIRP continues to work closely with these bodies on all matters related to non-ionizing radiation protection. Repacholi wrote a history of events leading up to the formation of ICNIRP in 2017.

Work at World Health Organization 
Repacholi took up a position at WHO in Geneva, Switzerland in 1995, so in May 1996 he resigned from ICNIRP (conflict of interest working for both WHO and ICNIRP at the same time), and was elected an Emeritus member of ICNIRP. He was made Coordinator of WHO's Radiation and Health Unit with responsibilities for conducting research and providing humanitarian assistance to the three countries most affected by the Chernobyl accident, Belarus, Russia and Ukraine. He managed the International Project on the Health Effects of the Chernobyl Accident, a US$20 million program of medical assistance and research for countries most affected by the accident.

Belarus was the most affected by the accident and so received much attention. Repacholi was awarded an honorary doctorate in 2002 by the Belarusian State Medical University at Minsk for his significant contributions to Belarus on the Chernobyl accident. He was also awarded the USSR Academy of Medical Sciences’ Speransky Gold Medal for “Great contributions to protection against ionizing and non-ionizing radiation”, and the NW Timofeef-Ressovsky Medal for “Valuable contribution to research on the effects of non-ionizing and ionizing radiation on human health and the environment” in 2004. Repacholi was a co-author of the final WHO report on the health effects of the Chernobyl Accident and co-author of WHO report on the health effects on the Iraqi population of depleted uranium munitions used during the First Gulf war.

Repacholi initiated and managed the International Electromagnetic Fields (EMF) Project at WHO in 1996. This successful project on electromagnetic radiation and its health effects has now been continuing at WHO for over 25 years and provides national authorities with sound advice and reports on the health effects of emissions of EMF from such devices as mobile phones and their base stations, WiFi, power lines, as well as medical, commercial and industrial applications of EMF. He has advised many countries on how to deal with public concerns about health effects from mobile phones, including assistance with developing national standards and public health policies. He was awarded an honorary doctorate by San Marcos University in Lima in 2011 for his significant contributions to Peru on non-ionizing radiation protection issues.

Repacholi has participated in 10 WHO Task Groups on various NIR and was elected Chairman of three of these Task Groups. He is the author or co-author of over 220 scientific publications and has been an invited keynote speaker for a large number of national and international conferences. and has taught at La Sapienza University in Rome and at the Ettore Majorana Foundation and Centre for Scientific Culture in Erice (Sicily). He assisted the Kingdom of Saudi Arabia to develop their RF field exposure regulations, chaired the Ireland Government Task Group to develop recommendations for government policy on the management of EMF safety, and helped the Governments of Malaysia, Singapore, Bahrain, Peru to develop their non-ionizing radiation programs. Repacholi was the only foreign scientists to participate on the UK Government independent expert group on mobile phones (Stewart Report) in 2000.

Work on solar ultraviolet radiation 
Repacholi also managed the INTERSUN UV radiation protection project. Repacholi collaborated with ICNIRP, the United Nations Environment Programme and the World Meteorological Organization to develop the internationally accepted ultraviolet index, the Global Solar UV Index. This index relates to the intensity of UV from the sun at any time of the day and advises on the level protection appropriate to protect against health effects of sunlight exposure (use of sunscreen, clothing, hats etc.). UV protection programs have been developed in schools to protect children and make them aware of the need to protect against excessive sun exposure. In turn, children teach their parents about the need for UV protection from the sun. The UV Index is now widely shown around the world on daily weather reports, national web sites and on many beaches. While it is difficult to determine exactly, it is likely that public awareness of science about the UV levels each day through the UV index has contributed to a significant reduction in skin cancer rates world-wide.

Repacholi retired from WHO in 2006, but continues to assist national authorities in many countries. He is currently Visiting Professor in the Department of Information Engineering, Electronics and Telecommunications (DIET) at La Sapienza University of Rome, Italy, but lives in Perth, Australia. As of 2021, Dr Repacholi is currently the Chair of the International Oversight Committee for the joint Japanese/South Korean animal study to replicate part of the US National Toxicology Programs (UNP) rodent carcinogenesis studies. He also chairs the International Oversight Committee for the review of the health effects and safety standards for RF fields by Latin American scientists (Latin-American Science Review).

Publications 
 Occupational Hazards from Non-Ionizing Electromagnetic Radiation. Czerski P, Repacholi MH, Sliney D, Villforth JC. Occupational Safety and Health Series No. 53, International Labour Office, Geneva 1985.
 Ultrasound:  Medical Applications, Biological Effects and Hazard Potential. Repacholi MH, Grandolfo M, and A. Rindi eds, New York Plenum Pub. Corp. 1986.
 Criteria for evaluating scientific literature and developing exposure limits.  MH Repacholi and JAJ. Stolwijk. Radiation Protection in Australia 9(3): 79–84; 1991.
 Non-ionizing radiations: Physical characteristics, biological effects and health hazard assessment.  M.H. Repacholi ed. International Non-Ionizing Radiation Committee/International Radiation Protection Association Publication. Proceedings 1st International INIRC Workshop. Available from: Australian Radiation Laboratory, Lower Plenty Road, Yallambie, Victoria, Australia, 3085. pp464. 1988.
 Guidelines and Standards.  MH. Repacholi. Proceedings 2nd International INIRC Workshop: Non-Ionizing Radiation, University of British Columbia, Vancouver, May 11–1, 1992.
 What is the evidence for increased cancers from 50/60 Hz field exposure? M H Repacholi. G William Morgan Lecture.  Health Physics Society Meeting, Columbus, Ohio, 21–25 June 1992.
 Electromagnetic fields and cancer: How ICNIRP has dealt with the issue. MH Repacholi Proceedings of the 9th Congress of the International Radiation Protection Association, Vienna, Austria, April 1996.
 The International EMF Project. MH Repacholi. Proceedings 3rd International INIRC Workshop on Non-Ionizing Radiation, Baden, Austria, April 1996.
 An evaluation of the copper-bromide laser for treating telangiectasia. S. McCoy, M. Hanna, P. Anderson, G. McLennan, M. Repacholi. Dermatologic Surgery 22: 551–557; 1996.
 Lymphomas in Eμ-pim1 transgenic mice exposed to pulsed 900 MHz electromagnetic fields. MH Repacholi, A Basten, V Gebski, D Noonan, J Finnie, A Harris. Radiation Research147: 631–640; 1997.
 Repacholi MH, Cardis E. Criteria for EMF health risk assessment. Radiat Prot Dosim 72:305-312; 1997.
 Global UV Index. MH Repacholi. Radiation Protection Dosimetry 91(3): 307–311, 2000.
 Science and the Precautionary Principle. KR Foster, P Vecchia, MH Repacholi. Science 288:980-981; 2000.
 Mobile phones and health. Independent expert group on mobile phones. Stewart W, Challis LJ, Barclay LW, Barton MN, Blakemore C, Coggan DNM, Cox D, Fellows J, Repacholi M, Rugg M, Swerdlow AJ, Varma TRK. J Radiol Prot 20 (2): 235–238; 2000.
 WHO activities to mitigate the health effects of the Chernobyl accident. MH Repacholi, G Souchkevitch, L Kheifets. Internat J Rad Med 4(1-4): 42–48; 2002.
 The global solar UV index:  A physician's tool for fighting the skin cancer epidemic. Commentary. A Meves, MH Repacholi, E Rehfuess. International Journal of Dermatology 42: 846–849; 2003.
 The Sensitivity of Children to Electromagnetic Fields. Kheifets L, Repacholi M, Saunders R, van Deventer E. Pediatrics 116:303-313; 2005.
 Does Ultraviolet Radiation Affect Vaccination Efficacy? Meves A, Repacholi MH. International Journal of Dermatology. 45:1019–1024; 2006.
 Is the current public health message on UV exposure correct? Lucas RM, Repacholi MH, McMichael AJ. Bulletin of the WHO 86 (6): 485–491; 2006.
 Health Effects of the Chernobyl Accident and Special Health Care Programmes. Bennett B, Repacholi MH, Carr Z (eds) Geneva: World Health Organization 2006
 World Health Organization's International Radon Project. Zielinski JM, Carr Z, Krewski D, Repacholi M. J Toxicol Environ Health 69(7):759-69; 2006.
 Static fields: Biological effects and mechanisms relevant to exposure limits. van Rongen E, Saunders RD, van Deventer ET, Repacholi MH. Health Phys. 92(6): 584 –590; 2007.
 An international project to confirm Soviet-era results on immunological and teratological effects of RF field exposure in Wistar rats and comments on Grigoriev et al. (2010). Repacholi MH, Buschmann J, Pioli C, Sypniewska R. Bioelectromagnetics 32:325-330; 2011.
 Scientific Basis for the Soviet and Russian Radiofrequency Standards for the General Public. Repacholi, MH, Grigoriev Y, Buschmann J, Pioli C. Bioelectromagnetics DOI 10.1002/bem.21742. 2012.
 Systematic review of wireless phone use and brain cancer and other head tumors. Repacholi MH, Lerchl A, Roosli M, Sienkiewicz Z, Auvinen A, Breckenkamp J, d’Inzeo G, Elliott P, Frei P, Sabine H, Lagroye I, Lahkola A, McCormick DL, Thomas S, Vecchia P. (2012) Bioelectromagnetics 33:187-206; 2012.
 A history of the International Commission on Non-Ionizing Radiation Protection. Repacholi MH. Health Phys. 113(4):282–300; 2017.

References

External links 
 Michael Repacholi Resume, IDDD.DE 

1944 births
Living people
Australian biophysicists
People from Taree
University of Western Australia alumni
Alumni of the University of London
World Health Organization